The Technopriests is an eight-issue comic book limited series created by writer Alejandro Jodorowsky, artist Zoran Janjetov, and colorist Fred Beltran.

Story 
The Technopriests follows three plots: The first follows Albino, as Supreme Technopriest, as he leads 500,000 young technopriests to the promised galaxy and the obstacles that they encounter along the way. During this time Albino also narrates, in the form of dictating his memoirs, the other two plots: his rise to the position of Supreme Technopriest and the experiences of his family during that same time period.

Plot 
Albino is an old man, recording his memories in the spaceship where he navigates through space with his pet Tinigrifi, leading 500,000 young technopriests to the promised galaxy. His story begins when a spaceship of pirates attack on the sacred asteroid where Panepha, a young virgin destined to become oracle of the Imperial Palace, lived. The pirates rape Panepha and she gives birth to three children: Almagro, Albino and Onyx. Onyx is rejected by her mother, who creates and leads the Great Kamenvert Factory. But Albino doesn't like making cheese, he wants to be a videogame creator. With some reluctance, his mother sends him to Don Mossimo, the director of a technopriest training school. There he begins his journey to become Supreme Technopriest and start a new society, where human relationships will be valued more highly than scientific advances.

Characters 
Albino The future Supreme Technopriest and the narrator of the series.
Tinigrifi Albino's lifelong companion and co-narrator.
Panepha Former priestess and mother of Almagro, Albino, and Onyx.
Almagro Albino's older half-brother as well as one of his triplet siblings and the most-favored child of Panepha.
Onyx Albino's younger half-sister as well as one of his triplet siblings and the least-favored child of Panepha.

Albums 
The Technopriests was originally released in 8 issues:
 The Technopriests #1: Techno Pre-School
 The Technopriests #2: Nohope Penitentiary School
 The Technopriests #3: Planeta Games
 The Technopriests #4: Halkattraz
 The Technopriests #5: The Sect of the Techno-Bishops
 The Technopriests #6: The Secrets of the Techno-Vatican
 The Technopriests #7: The Perfect Game
 The Technopriests #8: The Promised Galaxy

See also
 The Incal

References

 

DC Comics limited series
Jodoverse
Les Humanoïdes Associés titles
Science fiction comics
1998 comics debuts
2006 comics endings
Rape in fiction